An Album of Favourite Waltzes, also known as A Collection of Favorite Waltzes, is an album by Mantovani and His Orchestra. It was released in April 1952 by London Records in the United States (catalog no. LL-570) and in October 1952 by Decca Records in the United Kingdom (catalog no. LK-4051).

Upon its release, Billboard magazine gave the album a score of 82 out of 100 and called it "a top-notch disk for pleasant dancing or just listening and dreaming."

It was later reissued on compact disc along with another Mantovani album, "An Album of Favorite Tangos".

Track listing
Side A
 "Dear Love, My Love"
 "Greensleeves"
 "Mexicali Rose"
 "It Happened in Monterey"
 "Poème"
 "I Love You Truly"

Side B
 "Love Lady"
 "Love, Here Is My Heart"
 "At Dawning"
 "Was It A Dream?"
 "Love's Roundabout"
 "Dancing With Tears In My Eyes"

References

1952 albums
London Records albums
Decca Records albums
Mantovani albums